Anthony Palou (born 1965, Quimper) is a French writer. From 1991 to 1997, Anthony Palou was Jean-Edern Hallier's private secretary.

As of 2016, he is a journalist for Le Figaro.

Bibliography 
 
 - Prix Décembre 2000.
 
 
- Prix Terre de France - La Montagne 2010.
- Prix des Deux Magots 2011.
- Prix Breizh 2011
 Dans ma rue y avait trois boutiques (Les Presses de la Cité,  2021)
- Prix Renaudot Essay (fr.: Le Renaudot de l'essai) 2021

References

External links 
 Politiques Undercover : le coup de gueule d'Anthony Palou on Le Figaro
 Norice on Babelio

20th-century French non-fiction writers
21st-century French non-fiction writers
Prix Décembre winners
Prix des Deux Magots winners
1965 births
Writers from Quimper
Living people
Prix Renaudot de l'essai winners